The Brasil Champions was a golf tournament on the Web.com Tour. It was first played in April 2013 at the São Paulo Golf Club in São Paulo, Brazil. It was the richest golf tournament in Brazil, with a purse of US$700,000.

Winners

Bolded golfers graduated to the PGA Tour via the Web.com Tour regular-season money list.

External links
Coverage on the Web.com Tour's official site

Former Korn Ferry Tour events
Golf tournaments in Brazil
Sport in São Paulo